Fenn Street may refer to:
Placenames
Fenn Street, Kent, England
Fenn Street, Suffolk, England
Fictional
location of British TV sitcoms, Please Sir! and The Fenn Street Gang